The Drakenstein Municipal Council is the elected unicameral legislature of the Drakenstein Local Municipality in Paarl, Western Cape, South Africa. 

The municipal council consists of sixty-five members elected by mixed-member proportional representation. Thirty-three councillors are elected by first-past-the-post voting in thirty-three wards, while the remaining thirty-two are chosen from party lists so that the total number of party representatives is proportional to the number of votes received.

The Council was established in the year 2000 and is currently governed by the Democratic Alliance.

Political control
The following parties/coalitions have governed the council:

Portfolio committees

MPAC
Corporate Services
Financial Services
Community Services
Local Labour Forum
Planning and Economic Development
Infrastructure Services
Training and Development
Appeal
Budget Steering

History
From 2000 to 2006, the mayor of the municipality was Christian Johannes George Leander of the NNP. It was divided into twenty-nine wards, with a total of fifty-eight councillors.

After the local government elections of 2006, a coalition was formed by the African National Congress (ANC) and the Independent Democrats (ID), and Charmaine Manuel of the ANC was elected as Mayor with Wilhelm Nothnagel of the ID as Deputy Mayor. The municipality was divided into thirty-one wards, with a total of sixty-one councillors.

In April 2007, the ID broke the coalition, and formed a new coalition with the Democratic Alliance (DA); Koos Louw of the DA was elected Mayor while Nothnagel remained Deputy Mayor. 

During the floor crossing period in September 2007, seven councillors (six from the ID, including Nothnagel, and an independent councillor) defected to the ANC, giving the ANC an outright majority (32 of 61 seats) on the council. Charmaine Manuel returned as Mayor, with Nothnagel continuing as deputy. 

In the 2011 local government elections the DA managed to turn the tables, and obtained an outright majority on the council, holding 35 seats out of 61. Gesie van Deventer was elected Mayor with Conrad Poole as Deputy Mayor.

In May 2016, Mayor Van Deventer resigned and Deputy Mayor Poole took office as Mayor. Gert Combrink was elected Deputy Mayor.

In the election of 3 August 2016 the Democratic Alliance (DA) obtained a majority of forty-three seats on the council. Conrad Poole was re-elected as Mayor, while Combrink was also re-elected.

Elections

Results 
The following table shows the composition of the council after past elections and floor-crossing periods.

December 2000 election

The following table shows the results of the 2000 election.

October 2002 floor crossing

In terms of the Eighth Amendment of the Constitution and the judgment of the Constitutional Court in United Democratic Movement v President of the Republic of South Africa and Others, in the period from 8–22 October 2002 councillors had the opportunity to cross the floor to a different political party without losing their seats.

In the Drakenstein council, the Democratic Alliance (DA) lost fifteen councillors to the New National Party (NNP), which had formerly been part of the DA. The DA also lost one councillor to the African Christian Democratic Party (ACDP), while the ACDP in turn lost two councillors to the African National Congress. The two councillors representing the Alliance for the Community crossed to the NNP.

September 2004 floor crossing
Another floor-crossing period occurred on 1–15 September 2004. Ten of the seventeen NNP councillors crossed to the ANC, three crossed to the Independent Democrats (ID), and two crossed to the DA. One councillor crossed from the African Christian Democratic Party to the Federation of Democrats, a new party.

By-elections from September 2004 to February 2006
The following by-elections were held to fill vacant ward seats in the period between the floor crossing periods in September 2004 and the election in March 2006.

March 2006 election

The following table shows the results of the 2006 election.

By-elections from March 2006 to August 2007
The following by-elections were held to fill vacant ward seats in the period between the election in March 2006 and the floor crossing period in September 2007.

September 2007 floor crossing
The final floor-crossing period occurred on 1–15 September 2007; floor-crossing was subsequently abolished in 2008 by the Fifteenth Amendment of the Constitution. In the Drakenstein council, the Independent Democrats lost five councillors to the African National Congress (ANC) and three to the new National People's Party. The single councillor from the Federation of Democrats also crossed to the ANC.

By-elections from September 2007 to May 2011
The following by-elections were held to fill vacant ward seats in the period between the floor crossing period in September 2007 and the election in May 2011.

May 2011 election

The following table shows the results of the 2011 election.

By-elections from May 2011 to August 2016
The following by-elections were held to fill vacant ward seats in the period between the elections in May 2011 and August 2016.

August 2016 election

The following table shows the results of the 2016 election.

By-elections from August 2016 to November 2021
The following by-elections were held to fill vacant ward seats in the period between the elections in August 2016 and November 2021.

November 2021 election

The following table shows the results of the 2021 election.

By-elections from November 2021
The following by-elections were held to fill vacant ward seats in the period from November 2021.

Notes

References

External links
  Drakenstein Municipality inaugurates DA-led council
  Drakenstein Local Municipality

Drakenstein
Organisations based in the Western Cape